Islay Hill is a volcanic cone, and is the southernmost of the nine volcanic mountains and hills that make up the Nine Sisters, located in the San Luis Obispo County of central California.

This chain of extinct, but possibly dormant volcanoes, the eight others volcanic plugs, stretches from Morro Bay southeast to Islay Hill, which is on the southeast side of San Luis Obispo (city).

References

External links 
 

Nine Sisters
Landforms of San Luis Obispo County, California
San Luis Obispo, California
Volcanic plugs of California
Hills of California